Baliodryas is a genus  of snakes in the family Colubridae. It is monotypic, being represented by the single species, Baliodryas steinbachi. It is endemic to South America.

Etymology
The specific name, steinbachi is in honor of Dr. Jose Steinbach (1856–1929), who collected biological specimens in South America.

Distribution and habitat
B. steinbachi is found in Bolivia and Brazil.

Biology
B. steinbachi is oviparous.

References

Further reading
Boulenger GA (1905). "Descriptions of new Snakes in the Collection of the British Museum". Annals and Magazine of Natural History, Seventh Series 15: 453–456. ("Rhadinæa Steinbachi ", new species, pp. 454–455).
Zaher H, Prudente ALC (2019). "The enigmatic Amazonian genus Eutrachelophis: morphological evidence and description of new taxa (Serpentes: Dipsadidae: Xenodontini)". Amphibia-Reptilia 41 (2): 215–231. (Baliodryas, new genus; B. steinbachi, new combination).

Dipsadinae
Monotypic snake genera
Taxa named by Hussam Zaher
Taxa named by Ana L.C. Prudente
Taxobox binomials not recognized by IUCN